The first USS Pocomoke (SP-571), later USS SP-571, was a United States Navy patrol vessel in commission from 1917 to 1918.

Pocomoke was built as a civilian freight boat of the same name by Brewster Brothers at Baltimore, Maryland. The U.S. Navy acquired her from her owner, the Fish Commission of the Commonwealth of Virginia, in 1917 for World War I service as a patrol vessel. She was commissioned on 24 April 1917 as USS Pocomoke (SP-571).

Pocomoke operated on section patrol duty for the rest of World War I.

The Navy returned Pocomoke to the Fish Commission on 22 October 1918.

Pocomoke should not be confused with USS Pocomoke (SP-265), a minesweeper also in commission during World War I.

References

NavSource Online: Section Patrol Craft Photo Archive: SP-571 ex-Pocomoke (SP 571)

Patrol vessels of the United States Navy
World War I patrol vessels of the United States
Ships built in Baltimore